Black Turtle Cove (Spanish: Caleta Tortuga Negra) is a mangrove estuary on the northern shores of Santa Cruz Island in Ecuador's Galapagos Islands.  The national park has strict regulations to protect this pristine environment. Tourists may visit the cove via panga (local dinghy) but with the engines turned off. Many rays, sea turtles, pelicans and other wildlife live among the mangroves. That is one of the famous places in Galapagos, which is the cave inside there.

References

Galápagos Islands
Landforms of Galápagos Province
Tourist attractions in Galápagos Province
Bodies of water of Ecuador